Asia Muhammad and Arina Rodionova were the defending champions, but Muhammad chose not to participate. 

Rodionova played alongside Ellen Perez and successfully defended her title, defeating Destanee Aiava and Naiktha Bains in the final, 6–7(5–7), 6–3, [10–7].

Seeds

Draw

Draw

References
Main Draw

Canberra Tennis International - Doubles
2018 in Australian tennis
2018